The 1958 FIFA World Cup final took place in Råsunda Stadium, Solna (near Stockholm), Sweden, on 29 June 1958 to determine the champion of the 1958 FIFA World Cup. Brazil won the World Cup by defeating Sweden, the host country, and thus won their first World Cup title.

The 1958 final holds the record for most goals scored in a World Cup Final, and it shares the record for the greatest winning margin (with the 1970 and 1998 tournaments). The records for both the youngest and oldest goalscorer in a World Cup final were set in this match by Pelé (17 years and 249 days) and Nils Liedholm (35 years, 263 days) respectively. The final also marked several firsts: It was the first final to be disputed between a European team and a team from the Americas. Sweden became the first, and so far, only host to lose a World Cup Final (the Maracanazo of 1950 was the decisive match of the tournament, but was not a 'Final', because Sweden v Spain was played simultaneously). Their loss also meant that for the first and only time a World Cup staged in Europe was not won by a European nation.

Match

Background
Since both teams wore a yellow kit as their first choice, a draw was arranged in order to decide which team would use its regular strip. Brazil boycotted the draw, thus making Sweden winner, and forcing Brazil to find another color to wear. Initially, Brazil was going to wear white, but this idea was rejected when the players were visibly frightened by the idea, recalling their loss in 1950. Eventually the staff went on to buy 22 blue T-shirts and sewed the Brazilian emblem.

Summary
Sweden took the lead after only 4 minutes after an excellent finish by captain Nils Liedholm. The lead did not last long, however, as Vavá equalised just 5 minutes later. On 32 minutes, Vavá scored a similar goal to his first to give Brazil a lead 2–1 at the break. 10 minutes into the second half, Brazil went further in front thanks to a brilliant goal scored by Pelé. He took control of the ball inside the penalty area, chipped the ball over the defender then smashed it past a helpless Kalle Svensson. Halfway through the second half Brazil went 4–1 up with a goal scored by Mário Zagallo. Simonsson pulled one back for Sweden with 10 minutes remaining but it was far too late. Pelé sealed the 5–2 victory for Brazil with a headed goal in stoppage time.

Details

See also
 Pelé: Birth of a Legend

References

External links

 1958 FIFA World Cup on FIFA.com

FIFA World Cup finals
Brazil national football team matches
Sweden national football team matches
Final
Final
Final
Sports competitions in Solna
20th century in Sweden
June 1958 sports events in Europe